Fischlin is a surname. Notable people with the surname include:

Daniel Fischlin, English academic
Mike Fischlin (born 1955), American baseball player

See also
Fischli